The PFL 1 mixed martial arts event for the 2018 season of the Professional Fighters League was held on June 7, 2018, at the Hulu Theater at Madison Square Garden in New York City, New York. This was the first regular season event of the tournament and included fights only in the featherweight and heavyweight divisions.

Background
Mike Kyle was expected to face Shawn Jordan at this event, however Kyle was removed from the bout for undisclosed reasons and replaced by Philipe Lins. On weigh in day, the fight suffered another set back as Jordan missed the 265-pound weight limit by over nine pounds, and the bout was scratched from the card all together. As a result, Philipe Lins was awarded 3 points via. walkover victory.

Originally fights were set between Alex Nicholson vs. Kevin Tiller and Caio Alencar vs. Jake Heun, however due to New York not allowing fighters to compete with a weight difference greater than 25 pounds, PFL reorganized the fights the day before the event to Alex Nicholson vs. Jake Heun and Caio Alencar vs. Kevin Tiller.

Results

Standings after event
The point system consists of outcome based scoring and bonuses for an early win. Under the outcome based scoring system, the winner of a fight receives 3 points and the loser receives 0 points. If the fight ends in a draw, both fighters will receive 1 point. The bonus for winning a fight in the first, second, or third round is 3 points, 2 points, and 1 point respectively. For example, if a fighter wins a fight in the first round, then the fighter will receive 6 total points. If a fighter misses weight, then the fighter that missed weight will receive 0 points and his opponent will receive 3 points due to a walkover (WO) victory.

Featherweight

Heavyweight

See also
List of PFL events
List of current PFL fighters

References

Professional Fighters League
Mixed martial arts in New York (state)
Sports in Manhattan
2018 in mixed martial arts
2018 in sports in New York (state)
June 2018 sports events in the United States